Los Algarrobos may refer to:
Los Algarrobos, Chiriquí, Panama
Los Algarrobos, Veraguas, Panama